Santa Monica State Beach is a California State Park operated by the city of Santa Monica.

Description
The beach is located along Pacific Coast Highway in Santa Monica. Visitor activities include volleyball, surfing, stand up paddleboarding, and swimming. Smoking at the beach is prohibited.

At the foot of Colorado Avenue, through the famous arch and sign, lies the historic Santa Monica Pier, which dates from 1909. The pier has a National Historic Landmark -– the 1922 Looff Hippodrome Carousel.

Just south of the pier volleyball courts is International Chess Park with public chess tables and a human-scale chessboard set into the sidewalk.

Palisades Park is located atop Santa Monica's cliffs, providing a vantage point to see the Santa Monica Beach and the Pacific Ocean.

The beach is the one in the album art for Umbrella Beach by Owl City features.

The beach will host beach volleyball and surfing during the 2028 Summer Olympics.

"Ink Well"

A section of the beach was referred to as "Ink Well" and "Negro Beach" in the early 20th century when it was one of the few areas in California where African Americans were allowed to enjoy beach access in a largely segregated society. Other areas for blacks were Bruce's Beach in Manhattan Beach and the Pacific Beach Club in Orange County. Nick Gabaldon, one of the first black surfers in California, lived in Santa Monica, and used the 200 foot roped off stretch of beach demarcated for blacks. He died after crashing into the Malibu Pier.

Arlington West

Arlington West was a temporary memorial created on Santa Monica Beach just north of the Santa Monica Pier at Santa Monica, every Sunday from sunrise to sunset.  Crosses are placed on the beach for each U.S. military person who has died in the Iraq War.  The number of crosses erected every Sunday now exceeds 4,000.  For military personnel killed within the week past, flag draped coffins with blue crosses are positioned in front.  The Arlington West Memorial, a project of Veterans For Peace, is intended to offer visitors a graceful, visually and emotionally powerful, place for reflection.

Wildlife
Snowy Plovers nest on the beach.

The California Office of Environmental Health Hazard Assessment (OEHHA) has developed a safe eating advisory for fish caught in the Santa Monica Beach based on levels of mercury or PCBs found in local species.

Gallery of Santa Monica Beach images

See also
List of beaches in California
List of California state parks
 Santa Monica Pier Aquarium — Aquarium on the pier operated by Heal the Bay, and formerly known as the Ocean Discovery Center
 Pacific Park — the amusement park portion of the pier
 Hot Dog on a Stick — original, opened in 1946, found on the sidewalk just south of the pier in front the original Muscle Beach
 Pacific Ocean Park — former (1958-1967) amusement park one pier south of Santa Monica Pier; demolished in 1974
 Santa Monica bicycle path — path that runs through a bicycle-only underpass under the pier
 Membership discrimination in California social clubs

Notes

External links

City of Santa Monica: official Santa Monica State Beach website
 California State Parks: official Santa Monica State Beach website
Santa Monica Beach 
LAMountains.com: Santa Monica State Beach

Beaches of Southern California
Santa Monica, California
California State Beaches
Parks in Los Angeles County, California
Tourist attractions in Santa Monica, California
Beaches of Los Angeles County, California
Venues of the 2028 Summer Olympics
Olympic volleyball venues
Olympic surfing venues
Beach volleyball venues in the United States